Noel Fincher (10 June 1944 - 11 October 2016) was an  Australian rules footballer who played with Footscray and North Melbourne in the Victorian Football League (VFL).

Notes

External links 

		
		
1944 births		
2016 deaths				
Australian rules footballers from Victoria (Australia)		
Western Bulldogs players		
North Melbourne Football Club players